John Herman Schaeffer  (1941 – 14 July 2020) was a Dutch-born Australian art collector, philanthropist and businessman. Schaeffer predominantly collected 19th-century British art, specialising in works by the Pre-Raphaelite Brotherhood. Schaeffer emigrated to Australia from the Netherlands in the late 1950s, working as a ship's steward. In Australia Schaeffer established a security and cleaning company, Tempo Services Ltd., which he later sold. In 2004 Schaeffer sold Rona, previously the most expensive house in Sydney, which he had acquired in 1989.

Schaeffer initially collected 19th-century Australian paintings, but was entranced by the 1984 exhibition The Pre-Raphaelites at Tate Britain. His initial art purchases in the 1970s were Australian paintings by Rupert Bunny, E. Phillips Fox and John Russell. Three paintings from Schaeffer's collection (all purchases) are in the permanent collection of the Leighton House Museum in Holland Park, West London. The restoration of the gilded ceiling of the Narcissus Hall at Leighton House was also supported by Schaeffer. Schaeffer's art collection held 200 pieces at its peak, but was greatly diminished by business debts and the financial effects of his divorce.

Together with his partner, Bettina Dalton, Schaeffer was a part-owner of the British Movietone Archive. Schaeffer was a board member of the National Gallery of Australia Foundation, as well as a board member and Life Governor of the Art Gallery of New South Wales.

Schaeffer died at St Vincent's Hospital on 14 July 2020 at the age of 79 after being hit by a utility vehicle on Macquarie Street in central Sydney. He is survived by his partner of 18 years Bettina Dalton.

References

1941 births
2020 deaths
Australian art collectors
Australian company founders
Dutch emigrants to Australia
Officers of the Order of Australia
Road incident deaths in New South Wales